The March of Peace is an annual peace walk in Bosnia and Herzegovina  organized in memory of the victims of the 1995 Srebrenica genocide. The march gathers thousands of Bosnians and foreigners each year.  The first march was held in 2005, to mark the tenth anniversary of the genocide. The campaign lasts three days, culminating in the participants' arrival to the village Potočari, where the Srebrenica Genocide Memorial-Cemetery is located. The participants arrive a day prior for the mass funeral that occurs for those victims who have been found from the previous year. The search for bodies of the victims is ongoing every year.

Background

The event, which has been organized since 2005, marks the killing of Bosniaks who survived after the fall of Srebrenica in July 1995 and tried to reach territory controlled by the Army of the Republic of Bosnia and Herzegovina. The Peace March became an international event, and a large number of people from around the world joined the March. In 2012, there were nearly 8,000 participants.

Event
The march usually begins in the village Nezuk by Sapna on or around 8 July.

In addition to the pedestrian campaigns, support also comes from participants who engaged in Cycling Marathons.

International response
  On 8 July 2013, the US Ambassador to Bosnia and Herzegovina Patrick Moon held a brief speech to participants during the march, saying that he was honored to attend such an event and that he wanted to pay tribute to the victims of genocide in Srebrenica.

References

External links
Marš mira organization official website

Peace organizations based in Bosnia and Herzegovina
Srebrenica massacre